Khademabad (also Romanized as Khādemābād and Khādemabād; also known as Kalāteh-ye Khādemābād) is a village in Meyami Rural District, Razaviyeh District, Mashhad County, Razavi Khorasan Province, Iran. At the 2006 census, its population was 479, in 112 families.

References 

Populated places in Mashhad County